An assassin is a person who commits targeted murder.

Assassin may also refer to:

Origin of term 

 Someone belonging to the medieval Persian Ismaili order of Assassins

Animals and insects 

 Assassin bugs, a genus in the family Reduviidae
 Assassin spiders, a genus in the family Archaeidae

Literature
 The Assassin (play), a 1945 play by Irwin Shaw
 Assassin (Cain novel), a 2008 thriller novel by Tom Cain, the third Samuel Carver book
 Assassin (Myers novel), a 2006 historical fiction novel by the children's author Anna Myers
 Assassins (LaHaye novel), a 1999 novel in the Left Behind series by Jerry B. Jenkins and Tim Lahaye
 Krondor: The Assassins, a 1999 novel by Raymond E. Feist
 "The Assassin", a character in the 2006 Noble Warriors book trilogy
 The Assassin, novel by Harlan Ellison
 "The Assassin", story by Guy De Maupassant
 The Assassini, a 1990 novel by Thomas Gifford
 The Assassins by Elia Kazan
 The Assassins, a 2005 novel by Oliver North
 "The Assassins", a short story by Ernest Hemingway
 The Assassins: A Radical Sect in Islam, a 1967 non-fiction book by Bernard Lewis
 The Hassassin in Dan Brown's Angels & Demons, 2000
The Assassins' Guild in Terry Pratchett's Discworld series

Comics and visual novels 

 Assassin (Fate/stay night), a fictional character
 Assassin (Fate/Zero), a fictional character

Film and TV

Films 
 Assassin (1969 film), a South Korean thriller film
 Assassin (1973 film), a British thriller film starring Ian Hendry
 Assassin (1986 TV film), a television science fiction film starring Robert Conrad
 Assassin (2015 film), a British thriller film by J. K. Amalou starring Danny Dyer
 Assassin's Creed (2016 film), an American US film directed by Justin Kurzel
 Assassins (1995 film), an American film starring Sylvester Stallone and Antonio Banderas
 Assassins (2020 film), an American documentary film
 Assassin(s), a 1997 French film
 Margaret Cho: Assassin, a 2005 film by Margaret Cho
 The Assassin (1961 film), an Italian film
 The Assassin (1967 film), a 1967 Shaw Brothers film
 The Assassin (2015 film), a Taiwanese-Hong Kong-Chinese film directed by Hou Hsiao-Hsien
 The Assassin (2023 film), an upcoming South Korean historical action-drama film
 Point of No Return (1993 film), a film also known as The Assassin
 The Assassin, also known as Yakuza Deka, a 1970 Japanese film starring Sonny Chiba
 The Assassin, the UK title for Gunfighters, a 1947 American film directed by George Waggner
 The Assassins (film), a 2012 Chinese film
 Venetian Bird, a 1952 British film starring Richard Todd, known as The Assassin in the USA
 Assassin (2023 film), an upcoming American film starring Bruce Wilis

Television 
 "Assassin" (Law & Order: Criminal Intent), a 2008 episode of the television series Law & Order: Criminal Intent
 "Assassin", a 1981 episode of the BBC series Blake's 7
 "Assassins" (Desperate Housewives), a 2011 episode of the seventh season of the series
 "The Assassin" (The Borgias), a 2011 episode of the Showtime-Bravo! series The Borgias
 "The Assassin", an episode from the first season of MacGyver

Games

Video gaming 
 Assassin (video game), a 1992 video game
 Assassin's Creed, a game series by Ubisoft  
Assassin, a secret unlockable character in the Soulcalibur series, debuting in Soulcalibur II
 The Assassin (cancelled video game), an unreleased game from OMC Games

Role playing 
 Assassin (character class), a character class common to many games
 Assassin (Dungeons & Dragons)
 Assassin (game), a live-action role-playing game

Music 
 Assassin (band), an American heavy metal band
 Assassin (deejay) (born 1982), Jamaican dancehall deejay
 Assassin (German band), a German thrash metal band
 Assassin (rap crew), a French hardcore rap group

Stage 
 Assassins (musical), a 1990 musical with music and lyrics by Stephen Sondheim

Albums 
 Assassin (album), a 1984 album by Assassin
 Assassins (album), by Into a Circle
 Assassins: Black Meddle, Part 1, a 2008 album by Nachtmystium
 I, Assassin, a 1982 album by Gary Numan
 The Assassin (album), by Big Ed

Songs 
 "Assassin" (Muse song), 2006
 "Assassin" (The Orb song), 1992
 "Assassin", a song by John Mayer on the album Battle Studies
 "Assassin", a song by Morbid Saint on the album Spectrum of Death
 "Assassin", a song by Motörhead on the album Snake Bite Love
 "Assassing", a song by Marillion on the album Fugazi
 "Assassins", a song by noise rock duo Lightning Bolt from the album Wonderful Rainbow
 "Assassins", a song by The Insane Clown Posse on the album The Amazing Jeckel Brothers
 "The Assassin", a song by Iron Maiden from the 1990 album No Prayer for the Dying

Sports 
 Assassin (horse) (1779–c. 1794), Thoroughbred racehorse that won the 1782 Epsom Derby
 The Assassin, a nickname for former American football defensive back Jack Tatum
 The Assassin, a nickname for street basketball player Brandon Durham
 The Assassin, a ring name of professional wrestler Jody Hamilton
 The Assassins (professional wrestling), a wrestling tag team

Other uses 
 All Sky Automated Survey for SuperNovae (ASAS-SN)

See also 
 List of assassins
 Assassination (disambiguation)
 League of Assassins, a group of fictional villains appearing in comic books published by DC Comics